Gillian Louise White (born 20 June 1939) is an English sculptor based in Switzerland. She has specialised in large scale works for public spaces.

Biography
White was born in Orpington, Kent, and attended the Elmhurst Ballet School which was then in Camberley. She studied at Saint Martin's School of Art and the Central School of Art and Design in London, and École nationale supérieure des Beaux-Arts in Paris.

In 2009 the  held a retrospective exhibition of her work.

Since 1972 she has lived and worked in Leibstadt, Canton of Aargau, Switzerland.

Selected publications

References

External links

1939 births
Living people
20th-century British sculptors
21st-century British sculptors
20th-century English women artists
21st-century English women artists
Alumni of Saint Martin's School of Art
Alumni of the Central School of Art and Design
École des Beaux-Arts alumni
Artists from Kent
English women sculptors 
English sculptors 
People educated at the Elmhurst School for Dance
People from Orpington